Lieutenant General Sir James Ronald Edmondston Charles,  (26 June 1875 – 24 December 1955) was a senior British Army officer in the Royal Engineers.

Family
Charles was born in Calcutta, British India, the son of Thomas Edmondston Charles, later honorary physician to King Edward VII, and Ada Henrietta Charles. He had two older sisters, Bessie and Ethel, who both studied architecture and became the first women members of the Royal Institute of British Architects.

Military career
Charles was educated at Winchester College and the Royal Military Academy  Sandhurst, and was commissioned into the Royal Engineers in 1894. He served in the Second Boer War (1899–1901), was mentioned in despatches (31 March 1900), and received the Distinguished Service Order in November 1900. He was part of the Bazar Valley and Mohmand Field Forces in 1908.

Charles spent most of the First World War in the General Staff until being promoted to command a re-constituted 25th Division in August 1918. He was appointed commander of the Waziristan Force in India in 1923 and then became commandant of the Royal Military Academy, Woolwich in 1924. He was Director of Military Operations and Intelligence at the War Office from 1926 and Master-General of the Ordnance from 1931. He retired in 1934.

Charles' nickname among the troops was 'Don Carlos', deriving from his commanding personality and his height of 6’ 4". He was also commandant of the Royal Engineers from 1931 to 1945 and Chief Royal Engineer from 1940 to 1946.

Civilian roles
From 1934 to 1953, Charles was a director of British Aluminium Company, appointed for his high level connections and knowledge of defence procurement procedures gained at the War Office and as Master General of the Ordnance.

References

|-

|-
 

|-

1875 births
1955 deaths
People educated at Winchester College
British Army generals of World War I
British Army personnel of World War II
British Army lieutenant generals
Commandants of the Royal Military Academy, Woolwich
Knights Commander of the Order of the Bath
Companions of the Order of St Michael and St George
Companions of the Distinguished Service Order
Royal Engineers officers
British people in colonial India